The 2020–21 Edmonton Oilers season was the 42nd season for the National Hockey League (NHL) franchise that was established on June 22, 1979, and 49th season overall, including their play in the World Hockey Association (WHA). The Oilers made the playoffs for the second straight year after being eliminated by the Chicago Blackhawks in the Qualifying Round of the 2020 Stanley Cup playoffs.

Due to the Canada–U.S. border restrictions brought in as a result of the COVID-19 pandemic, the Oilers were re-aligned with the other six Canadian franchises into the newly-formed North Division. The league's 56 game season was played entirely within the new divisions, meaning that Edmonton and the other Canadian teams played an all-Canadian schedule for the 2020–21 regular season as well as the first two rounds of the 2021 Stanley Cup playoffs.

On May 3, 2021, the Oilers clinched a playoff berth after they defeated the Vancouver Canucks 5–3. They were swept in the first round by the Winnipeg Jets, with a 4-3 triple overtime loss in game four on May 24.

Standings

Divisional standings

Schedule and results

Regular season
The regular season schedule was published on December 23, 2020.

Playoffs

Player statistics

Skaters

Goaltenders

†Denotes player spent time with another team before joining the Oilers. Stats reflect time with the Oilers only.
‡Denotes player was traded mid-season. Stats reflect time with the Oilers only.

Awards and honours

Milestones

Transactions
The Oilers have been involved in the following transactions during the 2020–21 season.

Trades

Free agents

Waivers

Signings

Draft picks

Below are the Edmonton Oilers' selections at the 2020 NHL Entry Draft, which was originally scheduled for June 26–27, 2020 at the Bell Center in Montreal, Quebec, but was postponed on March 25, 2020, due to the COVID-19 pandemic. The draft was held October 6–7, 2020 virtually via Video conference call from the NHL Network studio in Secaucus, New Jersey.

References

Edmonton Oilers seasons
Edmonton Oilers
Oilers